is a Japanese anime television series based on the Capcom video game series of the same name made by Production I.G, planned and written by Yasuyuki Muto, and chiefly directed by Itsuro Kawasaki. The series started broadcast on Japan's Chubu-Nippon Broadcasting (CBC) station in April 2009; other networks broadcast the episodes within a few days, including TBS, MBS, and Animax. Its first season made its North American television debut on the Funimation Channel on November 16, 2010.

The series was followed by a second season directed by Kazuya Nomura, Sengoku Basara: Samurai Kings II, which began broadcast in July 2010; and a film, Sengoku Basara: The Last Party, which was released on June 4, 2011. A new television series titled Sengoku Basara: End of Judgement began airing on July 6, 2014. This series is based on the video game Sengoku Basara: Samurai Heroes and, unlike the previous series, is animated by Telecom Animation Film.

Plot
In the Sengoku Period of feudal Japan, many generals fought in an endless struggle for national power and unification. One man proved to be too big of a threat: the "Demon King of Owari", Oda Nobunaga. Date Masamune and Sanada Yukimura, two young warlords from different regions who become heated rivals, begin to form an unlikely alliance with the rest of the generals to take down the "demon king". The first series follows the emergence of the protagonists, particularly the main protagonists Masamune and Yukimura, and their struggle against Nobunaga, who seeks to conquer the land under him and is willing to crush anyone, even his own allies, to do it. It ends with his defeat at Masamune and Yukimura's hands.

The second series witnesses the emergence of Toyotomi Hideyoshi as the next potential unifier of the land, though, unlike in actual history, he has no connection to the Oda clan, whose retainers were almost entirely wiped out along with him by the end of the first season.

The film finale depicts Japan as being in turmoil once again as Ishida Mitsunari, former subordinate of Hideyoshi, cuts a wrath of fury across the land in order to fulfill his revenge while the other leaders rally for an era of peace. Masamune and Yukimura must fight Mitsunari in order to bring the country to peace as something strange is going on behind the scenes.

Music
The opening theme song of the first season is "JAP" by Abingdon Boys School and its ending theme song is "Break & Peace" by Dustz. The second season's opening theme song is "Sword Summit" by T.M. Revolution and its ending theme songs are "El Dorado" and "Fate" by Angelo. The opening song for the movie is "FLAGS" by T.M. Revolution and the ending song is "The party must go on" by T.M. Revolution.

Characters

Although all characters are credited with their family name first, they will be placed last in this section for better reference.

Date Clan

Masamune is the ruler of the Date clan and known as the "One-eyed Dragon of Oshu". He is a slightly cocky, ambitious warlord who tends to pepper his speech. He usually wields a single katana, but he can store and fight with six swords at once (three in each hand, held between the fingers). His six swords are referred to as "The Dragon's Claws". He is depicted as having a rival relationship with Yukimura.

Kojūrō is Masamune's strategist and bodyguard in battle. He seems to agree with Masamune at some points in battle. He uses a katana and wakizashi set. He is referred to as "The Right Eye of the Dragon", for his skills as a bodyguard compensate for Masamune's missing right eye.

Takeda Clan

Yukimura is among the most distinguished warriors in the Takeda clan, wielding two yari, and is very hot-blooded and fanatically loyal to the Takeda. He is often depicted in a rival relationship with Masamune. Although he always looks at it as a test of strength, he is a common "punching bag" for Shingen's unnecessary brawls.

Shingen is the leader of the Takeda clan, famous for its cavalry, and is known as "The Tiger of Kai". He has a large, imposing frame and a brilliant mind. He wields a giant axe. He often starts large and unnecessary brawls with Yukimura, sometimes for no reason, usually by wrestling or exchanging names while hitting each other.

Sasuke is a ninja in the service of the Takeda clan. He is sneaky, cunning, and laid back but has a big sense of responsibility when necessary. Has a friendly rivalry with Kasuga, though the latter doesn't look at it that way. He wields two giant shuriken attached with an invisible razor wire. He also summons a crow familiar to glide down.

Uesugi Clan

Kenshin is the androgynous leader of the Uesugi clan, Takeda's rival and a devout monk to Bishamonten. Her/his accomplishments in battle earned her/him the moniker "The War God of Echigo". She/he wields a katana in a style using rapid movement and iaijutsu. Kenshin's is female in the original Japanese, but is identified as a man in the English dub.
	 

Kasuga is a ninja serving the Uesugi clan. She became drawn Kenshin at first sight (while attempting to assassinate her/him because of her father) and became her/his most loyal right-hand ninja. She takes her instructions seriously and has rivalries with Nōhime (regarding on those they protect) and Sasuke (as a ninja, and due to contradicting personalities). She uses eight kunai (four on each hand) tied with an invisible razor wire. Her familiar is an owl.

Oda Clan

Nobunaga is the ruler of the Oda clan and known as "The Demon King of Owari". He is ruthless and will stop at nothing until the world bows to his might. He wields a sword in one hand and a shotgun in the other. He is killed by Masamune and Yukimura at Azuchi Castle.

Nōhime is the wife of Nobunaga, who doesn't care very much for her, but still very devoted, showing no mercy to her enemies. She wields two handguns and is able to unleash other types of guns such as a cannon, shotgun or Gatling gun. She is killed by Oichi, who uses her dark powers, in Azuchi Castle.

Mitsuhide is an Oda clan vassal who would eventually betray Nobunaga. He wields two scythes, depicted as a sadistic psychopath that enjoys the suffering of other people, possibly of a greater evil than Nobunaga himself. He is seemingly burned alive when he battled Kojūrō at Honnō-ji Temple. However, he survived and appears as a monk named Tenkai in Sengoku Basara: The Last Party.

Ranmaru is a young soldier of the Oda clan. He eagerly desires recognition from his master and will fight tenaciously for him. He wields a bow and has assisted Nōhime and Mitsuhide when each of them attacked Kenshin and Kojūrō. After Mitsuhide died, Kojūrō lets Ranmaru live out his life, not being bound to the Oda clan anymore.

Azai Clan

Oichi is the wife of Nagamasa and younger sister of Nobunaga. She is depicted as a depressed woman who worries about Nagamasa and the friction between him and Nobunaga. While considered innocent looking, she has a dark side which can become dangerous once she snaps. She wields a double bladed naginata, which she can separate and chainlink to its bar. Her story, considered to be the most tragic, revolves around her witnessing Nagamasa being killed by Mitsuhide at Shitaragahara and being forced to fight in Nobunaga's name, slowly losing her sanity due to the loss of her husband and her brother's ruthless methods. In the end, she succumbs to her own dark powers.

 Nagamasa was a former ally of the Oda clan, but now breaking the alliance against them. He is a man fighting for justice and vows to stop anybody who wants to create evil, namely Nobunaga. He wields a long sword and a folding buckler. His fighting style and mannerism are similar to that of a typical superhero. He is also often seen telling Oichi to stop crying, only to shyly declare his love (sometimes with flowers). He is shot by Mitsuhide when Oichi goes to see him in the battlefield of Shitaragahara.

Tokugawa Clan

Ieyasu is the leader of the Tokugawa clan. Although small, he makes it up with his trust in his generals as well as his control over his most powerful general, Tadakatsu. He wields a bladed staff. But later discards the staff, fighting with his fists when he gets older in the second season.

Tadakatsu is one of the greatest generals under Ieyasu. A giant mechanized robot clad in armor, possessing great strength in each of his blows. He cannot talk. He wields a huge drill-spear.

Maeda Clan

Keiji is the nephew of Toshiie, and he is a vagabond and known to be called a happy-go-lucky man. Despite his demeanor towards his step-family, he loves them though shows resentment at them due to their objection to his lifestyle. Accompanying him is a small monkey named Yumekichi. He was former friends with Hideyoshi until a tragic event happened, which was caused by Hisahide, broke their friendship. His weapon is a ludicrously over-sized nōdachi. Despite its length, he can use it one-handed. He also uses its sheath, but rather than carry it around he throws it into the sky, having it come down just when he needs to use it.

Matsu is the wife of Toshiie and the aunt-in-law of Keiji. She is more responsible than her husband but loves him wholeheartedly. She and Toshiie sided with Hideyoshi for a short bit in the second season. She usually chases Keiji when he pulls pranks on her. She wields a naginata.

Toshiie is the husband of Matsu and the uncle of Keiji. He and Matsu sided with Hideyoshi for a short bit in the second season. He loves his wife Matsu dearly but he doesn't have much for brains and seems to be perpetually famished, often asking Matsu for more food. He wields a trident.

Toyotomi Clan

Hideyoshi is the ruler of the Toyotomi clan. He is depicted as a giant man, whose ambition is to rule all of Japan and form it into a formidable, prospering nation, which causes him to declare the Oda clan as a source of the chaos that started in Japan. Even though he has good intentions, he is drunk with power and will use any means, no matter how ruthless, to achieve it (though he is still charismatic and caring to his subordinates, unlike Nobunaga). He was former friends with Keiji until a tragic event happened, which was caused by Hisahide, broke their friendship. With just his bare hands, he can destroy a squadron in seconds. His weapons are his fists, which can be strengthened with magical arm guards.

Hanbei is Hideyoshi's strategist. He is intelligent and extremely loyal to Hideyoshi. Around his enemies, he is narcissistic, cold and very cruel. Given the chance, he can wipe them all out by swinging his weapon. His favorite methods of assassination are back-stabbing his opponents at his weapon's reach and snaring his opponents when they are not looking. Despite his physique, he suffers from tuberculosis. His weapon is a whipsword.

Mitsunari is a vassal of Hideyoshi in the second season. He views Hideyoshi as a role-model and serves him with absolute loyalty. He wields a katana and attacks faster than the eye can see, often having his weapon sheathed again before the enemy knows what has hit them. In Sengoku Basara: The Last Party, he is fueled by rage and obsessed with a desire to take revenge on Masamune for killing Hideyoshi, caring very little for other concerns, personal or political.

Shimazu Clan

Yoshihiro is the leader of the Shimazu clan. Although old, he is a great warrior who is not to be underestimated. He is also known for his impeccable ambush parties. He uses a broad sword. He is seen being killed by Nobunaga in the first season, but in the second season he survived. He aids Yukimura in leading an assault on Motonari in Satsuma.

Musashi claims to be a master swordsman, portrayed as a wild man itching for a fight to prove that he is the strongest man in Japan. He wields an Eku and a wooden sword. He plans on writing a novel of his journeys once the wars in Japan are over. During battle, he constantly taunts his opponent, usually calling them "baka" ("fool"). Yoshihiro is his mentor.

Other Clans

Yoshimoto is the leader of the Imagawa clan. He acts childish and cowardly but will fight when ultimately cornered. His lack of resolve costs his soldiers to lose heart multiple times while still in battle though his occasional bursts of courage would increase their morale, that is until the next time he panics again. He wields a giant fan. When Yukimura and Masamune prepare to attack him, he sends out decoys to escape. However, Nobunaga's operatives kill the decoys, and Yoshimoto is shot by Nobunaga himself.

Ujimasa is the leader of the Hōjō clan. He is mostly known for his impressive fortress named Odawara Castle, and his defensive stance towards the brewing war. He uses a multi-bladed spear. He summons Kotarō to attack Shingen, but Shingen manages to defeat Kotarō and kill Ujimasa afterwards.

Kotarō is a ninja who primary serves the Hōjō clan in the first season, but then serves Hisahide in the second season. His weapons are two ninja swords that he dual wields. He is depicted as a man who never talks, but takes action immediately. Like Kasuga and Sasuke, he can create duplicates of himself. Unlike Kasuga and Sasuke who need bird familiars to glide down, Kotarō can glide straightforward with just his body and can further glide when paired with his air attacks.

Hisahide is a very shrewd individual, being a manipulative, scheming man whose weapons are a sword and gunpowder. He is involved in various back stories, such as taking most of Masamune's retainers hostage and inciting Kojūrō's anger by humiliating Masamune. In another story, he humiliated and defeated Hideyoshi, causing him to be drunk on power and turned him from a sane man into a power-hungry ambitious man. He is the true cause of the chaos in Japan.

Motonari is the leader of the Mōri clan. He is known for possessing a great tactical mind, but thinks very little of his subordinates and sees them as disposable pawns. He wields a ringblade, which he can separate to become twin blades. He has a habit of watching the sunset. He is depicted as the rival of Motochika. In the second season, he forms an alliance with Hideyoshi. He destroys the Fugaku, Motochika's fortress, and rebuilds and renames it the Nichirin. However, Yukimura manages to destroy the Nichirin with his full power, seemingly killing Motonari in the process. However, Motonari survives and appears in Sengoku Basara: The Last Party.

Motochika is the leader of the Chōsokabe clan. His fortress, the Fugaku, has a cannon which repels his opponents and several mechanical machines. He wields a long anchor-like spear that is equipped with a metal chain which he uses as his weapon and his mode of land transportation. Motochika appears within many variable conflicts as a supposed rival to Motonari. When Hideyoshi parts the sea, he destroys the Fugaku and easily defeats Motochika. However, after still surviving, he and Masamune joined forces to attack Hideyoshi in Odawara.

Episode list

Season 1

Season 2

References

External links
 Sengoku Basara: Samurai Kings official website
 Sengoku Basara: Samurai Kings II official website
 Sengoku Basara: Samurai Kings at MBS
 Sengoku Basara: The Last Party official website
 

2010 Japanese television series endings
Anime composed by Hiroyuki Sawano
Anime television series based on video games
Funimation
Mainichi Broadcasting System original programming
Production I.G
Samurai in anime and manga
Sengoku Basara
Sengoku period in fiction
Shōnen manga